{{safesubst:#invoke:RfD||2=House of Bourbon–Anjou|month = March
|day =  4
|year = 2023
|time = 11:11
|timestamp = 20230304111157

|content=
REDIRECT Spanish royal family

}}